Bay City is an unincorporated community in Pope County, Illinois, United States.

A general store, built in 1915, overlooks the river. The store is restored, and open weekends. Bed and breakfast rooms are upstairs. Riverboats of past decades were dependable local transportation, and would stop for passengers or freight if hailed from the shore.
 

References

Unincorporated communities in Pope County, Illinois
Unincorporated communities in Illinois
Illinois populated places on the Ohio River